Ron Pettigrew Christian School (RPCS) is an accredited, K-12 Christian school in Dawson Creek, British Columbia.
RPCS is affiliated with the ACSI, and uses BC curriculum. It is governed by a board elected by the Dawson Creek Community Christian Education Society.

The school was started by a group of parents who wanted a school that was interdenominational. The parents chose the name, Ron Pettigrew, a coach/teacher/principal at Bethel Christian School(now named Mountain Christian School). Ron Pettigrew was killed in a car accident in 1988, along with five members of the senior boys basketball team. Before the accident, the school was known as Bethel Christian School, but in 1989 RPCS moved to its own building. In 1992, it built the facility it currently uses.

Mission statement
A place to learn and grow in Character, Competence, Contribution, and Christ-likeness. Ron Pettigrew Christian School is dedicated to providing a friendly and safe atmosphere for student learning and enjoyment.

Academics 
Accredited with BC Ministry of Education

Sports
In the school's inaugural year (1989-1990), despite not having a gymnasium (a gym was added in 2008), the high-school girls basketball team won the BC provincial championship. They would repeat that victory in 1991 with a record of 31–3. The same girls won the provincial title as Bethel Christian School in 1989. The team played all over Western Canada and made headlines as they "Turned Tragedy Into Inspirational Fire." The members of the team were: Jeanette Bailey, Heather Bailey, Susan Stanley, Allison Casseleman, Christy Wiebe, Danette Blouin, Diane Henderson, Paige Huzel, and Jody Eldridge. The team was coached by John Bailey and Joanne Haukenfrers.

The high school boys basketball team placed second in provincials in 1992, followed by 3rd and 5th-place finishes in the following years. In 2016, the Senior Boys basketball team won BC 1A provincials.

Building
Ron Pettigrew Christian School is expanding their current building with the addition of five new classrooms and a large common area.

In 2013-2014 a new playground was added. The updated structure replaced the wooden jungle gym, creating a fun, safe area.

References

External links
Ron Pettigrew Christian School Official

Private schools in British Columbia
Christian schools in Canada
Dawson Creek
Educational institutions established in 1989
1989 establishments in British Columbia